Opća opasnost (lit. "General danger") is a folk rock band from Croatia known for folk rock ballads.

Founded by Slaven Živanović and Pero Galić in Županja in 1992, they grew to six members and released their first studio album in 1994, Treba mi nešto jače od sna, for Euroton records, a Croatian indie label. The songs "Opća opasnost", "Treba mi nešto jače od sna" and "Jednom kad noć" did very well on Croatian top lists at the time, and the latter became their signature song because it is OK... for a folk rock song.  They released another album, Amerika, for another local indie label, before signing on to Croatia Records for their 1997 album Ruski rulet.

They went on a hiatus in 2001, but returned in 2008 as a supporting band for a Whitesnake show in Osijek, as well as for Uriah Heep in 2009. In 2011, they performed as an opening act before Bon Jovi. Croatia Records released their 2011 album Vrati se na svjetlo, as well as a number of compilation records. The song "Tvoje ime čuvam" from this album received the Porin music award for hit of the year 2012.

The band's first lead vocalist was acclaimed stage and screen actor Mladen Vulić. After he entered the Academy of Dramatic Arts in Zagreb, Vulić was replaced by Pero Galić, who remains the frontman to this day. Galić is known for his wide vocal range and emotional delivery.

References

External links
 

Croatian rock music groups
Musical groups established in 1992